Radley is a London-based, British accessories brand which designs and manufactures handbags, purses and other women's accessories for UK and international markets. The brand was founded by Lowell Harder in 1998. Justin Stead is the current CEO of the brand and was appointed in May 2015.

History

Early years
Radley founder and current Creative Director, Australian Lowell Harder, began working in the accessories industry as a weekend stall holder on London's Camden Market in 1984 selling Indian men's accessories brand Hidesign. Harder began working with the Hidesign design team and together developed new designs for the UK market.

Harder's business with Hidesign soon outgrew its market stall setting and needed increased investment and infrastructure which was supplied by the handbag company Tula Group in 1991. With the backing of the Tula Group, Harder was able to continue with Hidesign and in 1997, with a new working partner, develop a new women's accessories brand, Radley.

‘Harder launched it [Radley] in 1998 after becoming "fed up" with seeing bags in the same colours – such as black and navy. Instead she wanted to create something different and colourful,' wrote Drapers trade magazine in an interview with Harder in 2012.

Initial sales of Radley were low, however through a pre-existing relationship with Department store John Lewis via Hidesign, John Lewis began to trial a selection of Radley designs. Radley became a success for John Lewis, which then led to an interest from other UK based department stores.

Scottie dog logo
In an October 2012 interview with Drapers trade magazine, Radley founder Lowell Harder said of the conception of the brand's dog shaped logo 'we were experimenting with different things and one of the designers came-up with it. We hung it off a bag and people loved it.'

The dog logo, which hung from the bag strap, was put on a few ranges in the collection for Autumn/Winter 2000 but was added to most of the range by 2001 because of increased interest from customers. After the departure of Harder in December 2010, the new design team implemented a new version of the dog logo which saw a negative reception from the consumer. In her October 2012 Drapers magazine interview, she explained why the original design of the logo was reinstated on her return 'He was changed after I left and was made too butch. The idea of him was that he was meant to look cute and fun so we are going back to that…it was important to us that we changed him back.'

First buy-out
With the increased sales of Radley in 2002, Harder led a buyout of Tula Group from its founding members. Tula and Hidesign were maintained as brands

Second buy-out
Phoenix Equity Partners purchased a majority stake of Radley in a £45m deal in March 2006. It was listed again for sale the following December in 2007. The majority stake was purchased in a second buyout by private equity fund Exponent Private Equity in a transaction valued at £130m.  Exponent Private Equity presently maintains their majority ownership to this day alongside Radley's management team and Phoenix Equity Partners reinvested as minority stakeholders.

Retail

UK
The company's first store opened in 2005 on London's King's Road. There are currently 2 full-price Radley stores and 16 outlets in the UK. The brand is also currently stocked in a number of other retail locations and department stores across the UK including British retailers Fenwick Ltd, John Lewis and House of Fraser.

International
Radley is currently stocked in Germany, Switzerland, Japan, Russia, South Africa, Thailand, New Zealand and The Netherlands at Bataviastad Outlet Shopping Center. The bags are also available at Macy’s in the United States.

Online
Radley started online trading in 2007 and is currently stocked online in the UK by John Lewis, House of Fraser, Next and Shop Direct.

Rebranding
The company re-branded in Autumn 2009 to Radley London.

Collaborations
In 2013, Radley collaborated with the Scottish fashion designer Holly Fulton for a capsule collection of accessories. In 2010, and again in 2013, Radley announced a partnership with Harris Tweed, to incorporate the Scottish textiles into their handbag designs. There have also been capsule collections with the Victoria & Albert Museum and illustrators William Grill, Emma Cowlam and Rory Crichton.

Brand ambassadors
From Spring/Summer 2012 through to Spring/Summer 2013, Vogue UK's contributing Editor Laura Bailey was Radley's Brand Ambassador. The partnership also saw the launch of two capsule collections co-designed by Bailey. For Autumn/Winter 2013, British model Erin O'Connor appeared in Radley's UK advertising campaign.

Product offering
The brand currently produces handbags, small leather goods, luggage, hats, scarves, gloves, eyewear, casual footwear, watches, gifts and stationery. Radley launched their signature fragrance Radley London in March 2015. The fragrance is available in an Eau De Parfum, body wash and body lotion.

Charity

British Heart Foundation
Radley has maintained a working relationship with the British Heart Foundation, a UK based cardiovascular research charity, over the last five years. In that time Radley has produced two capsule collections with a portion of the proceeds being donated to the charity.

References

External links
Official website

Companies established in 1984
British brands
Fashion design